Phantom of the Paradise is a 1974 American rock musical comedy horror film written and directed by Brian De Palma and scored by and starring Paul Williams. In the film, a naïve young singer-songwriter (played by William Finley) is tricked by legendary but unscrupulous music producer Swan (Williams) into giving up his life's work, a rock opera based on the Faust legend. The composer dons a bizarre new persona to terrorize Swan's new concert hall in revenge and to have his favorite singer, Phoenix (played by Jessica Harper), perform his music.

The story is a loosely adapted mixture of several classic European works: Gaston Leroux's 1910 novel The Phantom of the Opera, Oscar Wilde's 1890 The Picture of Dorian Gray, and Faust by Goethe/Christopher Marlowe.

The film was a box office failure and received negative reviews contemporaneously, while earning praise for its music and receiving Academy Award and Golden Globe nominations. However, over the years, the film has received much more positive reviews and has become a cult film.

Plot
Singer-songwriter Winslow Leach is heard by acclaimed record producer Swan as Winslow plays an original composition following a set run through by the 1950s-style nostalgia band the Juicy Fruits, which Swan produces. Swan believes Winslow's music perfect to open The Paradise — Swan's highly anticipated new concert hall — and has his right-hand man Arnold Philbin steal it, under the guise of producing Winslow.

One month later, Winslow goes to Swan's Death Records to follow up about his music but is thrown out. He sneaks into Swan's private mansion and observes several women rehearsing his music for an audition. One is Phoenix, an aspiring singer whom Winslow deems perfect for his music. Winslow realizes Swan's plan to open the Paradise with his music after he is thrown out again. In response, he disguises himself as a woman to sneak in and try to speak to Swan. Swan has Winslow beaten and framed for drug dealing. Winslow is given a life sentence in Sing Sing prison and his teeth are extracted and replaced with metal ones as part of an experimental prisoner program to decrease infection amongst inmates, funded by the Swan Foundation.

Six months later, Winslow hears that the Juicy Fruits have made an anticipated hit record of his music with Swan's backing. After a breakdown, he escapes prison in a delivery box and breaks into the Death Records building. A guard startles Winslow as he is destroying the records and presses, causing him to slip and fall face first into a record press, which crushes and burns the right half of his face, also destroying his vocal cords. He barely manages to escape the studio, falling into the East River as the police arrive.

A disoriented, and now deformed, Winslow sneaks into The Paradise's costume department and dons a long, black cape and a silver, owl-like mask, becoming the Phantom of the Paradise. He terrorizes Swan and his musicians and nearly kills the Beach Bums (formerly the Juicy Fruits, who have traded doo-wop for surf music) with a bomb while they are playing a heavily reworked version of Winslow's own Faust song. The Phantom confronts Swan, who recognizes him as Winslow and offers the composer a chance to have his music produced his way. In a specially built recording studio, Swan provides the Phantom with an electronic voice-box, enabling him to speak and sing. Swan asks Winslow to rewrite his cantata with Phoenix in mind for the lead. Although Winslow agrees and signs a contract in blood, Swan breaks the deal by telling Philbin that he resents Phoenix's perfection for the role. The Phantom completes Faust, but Swan replaces Phoenix with a pill-popping male glam rock prima donna named Beef in the lead of Winslow's Faust and relegates Phoenix to backup.

Swan steals the completed cantata and seals the Phantom inside the recording studio with a brick wall. Winslow escapes and confronts Beef, in a comic allusion to the shower scene in Psycho, and threatens to kill him if he performs. Beef tries to flee, but is forced by Philbin to stay and play with the band the Undeads (the Juicy Fruits/Beach Bums rebranded again as a glam/goth act) who now all resemble Cesare the Somnambulist from The Cabinet of Dr. Caligari. As Beef performs, the Phantom, hidden in the rafters, strikes and electrocutes Beef with a stage prop. Horrified, Philbin orders Phoenix onstage and she is an immediate sensation.

Swan seduces Phoenix in her dressing room after the show with promises of stardom. As she leaves, she is spirited away by the Phantom to the roof. The Phantom tells Phoenix his true identity and implores her to leave The Paradise so Swan won't destroy her too. But Phoenix does not recognize or believe him and flees. At Swan's mansion, the Phantom observes Swan and Phoenix in a tight embrace. Heartbroken, he stabs himself through the heart with a bowie knife. However, Swan tells the Phantom that he cannot die until Swan himself has died. The Phantom attempts to stab Swan, but Swan is unharmed. Looking down at Winslow, Swan hisses in an almost reptilian voice, "I'm under contract, too."

Rolling Stone announces the wedding between Swan and Phoenix during Fausts finale. The Phantom learns that Swan made a pact with the Devil in 1953: Swan will remain youthful forever unless the videotaped recording of his contract is destroyed, and photos age and fester in his place. The tape reveals footage of Winslow signing his contract with Swan and a new one Swan made with Phoenix. On a live television camera, the Phantom realizes Swan is planning to have Phoenix assassinated during the ceremony. He destroys all the recordings and heads off to the wedding.

During the wedding, an extravaganza with dancing women dressed as black birds (alluding to Swan Lake), the Phantom stops the assassin from hitting Phoenix; the Pope-costumed Philbin is shot and killed instead. The Phantom swings onto the stage and rips off Swan's mask, exposing him as a decaying monster on live television. A crazed Swan attempts to strangle Phoenix but the Phantom intervenes and stabs him repeatedly. In doing so, the Phantom's own stab wound reopens and he starts bleeding. As he is dying, Swan is carried around by the audience, who join in the mania, stabbing him. The dying Winslow removes his mask to reveal his own face and holds out a hand to Phoenix. Swan dies, allowing Winslow to die of his own wound. As Winslow succumbs, Phoenix finally recognizes him as the kind man she met at Swan's mansion and embraces him as he dies.

Cast
 William Finley as Winslow Leach / The Phantom 
 Paul Williams as Swan / The Phantom's singing voice
 Jessica Harper as Phoenix
 Gerrit Graham as Beef
 Raymond Louis Kennedy as Beef's singing voice
 George Memmoli as Arnold Philbin (named in tribute to Mary Philbin who starred as Christine in the 1925 film version of Phantom of the Opera)
 Archie Hahn, Jeffrey Comanor, and Peter Elbling (credited as Harold Oblong) as The Juicy Fruits / The Beach Bums / The Undead
 Rod Serling (uncredited) as Introductory voice
 Janus Blythe as Groupie 
 Mary Margaret Amato as Swan's Groupie
Cheryl Smith as Groupie

Musical numbers
The film's soundtrack album features all songs excluding "Never Thought I'd Get to Meet the Devil" and "Faust" (1st Reprise). All words and music are by Paul Williams.
 "Goodbye, Eddie, Goodbye" – The Juicy Fruits
 "Faust" – Winslow
 "Never Thought I'd Get to Meet the Devil" – Winslow
 "Faust" (1st Reprise) – Winslow, Phoenix
 "Upholstery" – The Beach Bums
 "Special to Me" – Phoenix
 "Faust" (2nd Reprise) – The Phantom
 "The Phantom's Theme (Beauty and the Beast)" – The Phantom
 "Somebody Super Like You" (Beef construction song) – The Undead
 "Life at Last" – Beef
 "Old Souls" – Phoenix
 "The Hell of It" (plays over end credits) – Swan

Charts

Production

The record press in which William Finley's character was disfigured was a real injection-molding press at Pressman Toys. He was worried about whether the machine would be safe, and the crew assured that it was. The press was fitted with foam pads (which resemble the casting molds in the press), and there were chocks put in the center to stop it from closing completely. Unfortunately, the machine was powerful enough to crush the chocks and it gradually kept closing. Finley was pulled out in time to avoid injury.

The electronic room in which Winslow composes his cantata, and where Swan restores his voice, is in fact the real-life recording studio The Record Plant. The walls covered with knobs are in reality an oversize custom-built electronic synthesizer dubbed TONTO, which still exists to this day.

The City Center concert hall in New York City provided the exterior for The Paradise; interior concert scenes were filmed at the Majestic Theater in Dallas, Texas. The extras in the audience had responded to an open cattle call for locals interested in being in the film.

Sissy Spacek was the film's set dresser, assisting her then-boyfriend-now-husband Jack Fisk, the film's production designer. She later starred in De Palma's Carrie in 1976.

A novelization of the film was written by Bjarne Rostaing. Apparently based on an early draft of the screenplay, the novel excludes the supernatural angle of the film.

The film was financed independently. Producer Pressman then screened the movie to studios and sold it to the highest bidder, 20th Century Fox, for $2 million plus a percentage.

As originally filmed, the name of Swan's media conglomerate "Swan Song Enterprises" had to be deleted from the film prior to release due to the existence of Led Zeppelin's label Swan Song Records. Although most references were removed, "Swan Song" remains visible in several scenes.

Release
Phantom of the Paradise opened at the National theater in Los Angeles on October 31, 1974, and grossed $18,455 in its first weekend, increasing its gross the following weekend with $19,506, with a total gross of $53,000 in two weeks. In two months, Variety tracked it grossing $250,000 from the major markets it covered. The film was successful during its theatrical release in Winnipeg, Manitoba, where it opened on Boxing Day 1974 and played continuously in local cinemas over four months and over one year non-continuously until 1976. The soundtrack album sold 20,000 copies in Winnipeg alone, and was certified Gold in Canada. The film played occasionally in Winnipeg theaters in the 1990s and at the Winnipeg IMAX theater in 2000, drawing a "dedicated audience".

Williams performed the song "The Hell of It" on a 1977 episode of The Brady Bunch Hour, and also performed it in The Hardy Boys and Nancy Drew Meet Dracula the same year.

Critical reception
Vincent Canby of The New York Times wrote that the film attempted to parody "Faust, The Phantom of the Opera, The Picture of Dorian Gray, rock music, the rock music industry, rock music movies and horror movies. The problem is that since all of these things, with the possible exception of Faust (and I'm not really sure about Faust), already contain elements of self-parody, there isn't much that the outside parodist can do to make the parody seem funnier or more absurd than the originals already are." Gene Siskel of the Chicago Tribune gave the film two stars out of four, writing that "what's up on the screen is childish; it has meaning only because it points to something else. To put it another way, joking about the rock music scene is treacherous, because the rock music scene itself is a joke." Variety called the film "a very good horror comedy-drama" with "excellent" camera work, and stated that all the principal actors "come across extremely well." Kevin Thomas of the Los Angeles Times called the film "delightfully outrageous," adding that De Palma's sense of humor "is often as sophomoric as that which he is ostensibly spoofing. Fortunately, this tendency diminishes as Phantom of the Paradise progresses, with the film and the Faustian rock opera within it gradually converging and finally fusing in a truly stunning and ingenious finale." Pauline Kael of The New Yorker was positive, stating, "Though you may anticipate a plot turn, it's impossible to guess what the next scene will look like or what its rhythm will be. De Palma's timing is sometimes wantonly unpredictable and dampening, but mostly it has a lift to it. You practically get a kinetic charge from the breakneck wit he put into 'Phantom;' it isn't just that the picture has vitality but that one can feel the tremendous kick the director got out of making it." Richard Combs of The Monthly Film Bulletin wrote, "Too broad in its effects and too bloated in style to cut very deeply as a parody of The Phantom of the Opera, Brian De Palma's rock horror movie is closer to the anything goes mode of a Mad magazine lampoon ... Phantom of the Paradise nevertheless offers fair competition to and comes on much like Tommy."

On Rotten Tomatoes the film holds a score of 86% based on 29 reviews, with an average grade of 7.3 out of 10 and the consensus: "Brian De Palma's subversive streak is on full display in Phantom of the Paradise, an ebullient rock opera that rhapsodizes creativity when it isn't seething with disdain for the music industry."

Home media
On September 4, 2001, Phantom of the Paradise was made available on DVD by 20th Century Fox Home Entertainment.

The film was given a Blu-ray release on August 4, 2014, by Shout! Factory under the Scream Factory label. This edition features an audio commentary, interviews, alternate takes, the original "Swan Song" footage, and original trailers, and television and radio spots.

Awards
The film was nominated for an Academy Award for Original Song Score and Adaptation and a Golden Globe Award for Best Original Score – Motion Picture.

Legacy
A fan-organized festival, dubbed Phantompalooza, was held in 2005 in Winnipeg, where the fanbase took particularly strong root. That event featured appearances by Gerrit Graham and William Finley, in the same Winnipeg theatre where the film had its original run in 1975. A second Phantompalooza was staged April 28, 2006, reuniting many of the surviving cast members and featuring a concert by Paul Williams.

A successful concert production of the show, adapted by Weasel War Dance Productions, premiered March 12, 2018, at The Secret Loft in New York City.

Musician Sébastien Tellier wrote about his song "Divine" on his album Sexuality: "This is my tribute to the Beach Boys and the Juicy Fruits (from the 1974 musical Phantom of the Paradise). It's about a time of innocence – when having fun was more important than picking up girls. I visualise a bunch of kids having fun on the beach and I'd really love to play with them."

Upon Finley's death in April 2012, Bret Easton Ellis wrote on Twitter: "RIP: Winslow Leach a.k.a. William Finley one of my favorite characters in one of my favorite movies: De Palma's The Phantom of the Paradise."

According to a Guardian interview with Daft Punk,
"Hundreds of bands may tout cinematic references, yet few have them as hard-wired as Daft Punk. Guy-Manuel de Homem-Christo and Thomas Bangalter met two decades ago this year, at the perfect cinema-going ages of 13 and 12 ... the one movie which they saw together more than 20 times was Phantom of the Paradise, Brian De Palma's 1974 rock musical, based loosely around Phantom of the Opera (both this and Electroma feature 'a hero with a black leather outfit and a helmet')."

The electrocution scene in Romeo's Distress'' was created in tribute to Beef's death on stage.

See also

 List of American films of 1974

References

External links

 
 
 
 
 Detailed article: Why Winnipeg? The 1975 Phantom Phenomenon

1974 films
1974 comedy films
1974 horror films
1974 independent films
1974 musical films
1970s American films
1970s comedy horror films
1970s English-language films
1970s monster movies
1970s musical comedy films
20th Century Fox films
American comedy horror films
American independent films
American monster movies
American musical comedy films
American rock musicals
American satirical films
Films about composers
Films based on multiple works
Films based on The Phantom of the Opera
Films based on The Picture of Dorian Gray
Films directed by Brian De Palma
Films set in 1974
Films set in a theatre
Films set in New York (state)
Films shot in Texas
Parodies of horror
Works based on the Faust legend